Chambeyronia is a genus of flowering plants in the family Arecaceae. 
It contains the following species, both endemic to New Caledonia: Relationships between Chambeyronia and the other genera of subtribe Archontophoenicinae, including the Australian Archontophoenix and the New Caledonia endemic Actinokentia and Kentiopsis are unresolved.

 Chambeyronia lepidota  H.E.Moore
 Chambeyronia macrocarpa (Brongn.) Vieill. ex Becc.

References

 
Arecaceae genera
Endemic flora of New Caledonia
Taxonomy articles created by Polbot
Taxa named by Eugène Vieillard